Joe Lycett's Got Your Back is a Channel 4 consumer affairs comedy programme. It is presented by the titular comedian Joe Lycett, with assistance from deadpan comedian Mark Silcox, plus a guest television personality. The programme also contains pieces from comedians Rosie Jones and Sophie Duker.

The show involves the presenters doing comedic skits explaining and resolving consumer issues that viewers have raised to the programme.

Premises 
Before the programme, Lycett's own comedic stand-up show often involves a previous complaint he had with Leeds City Council over a parking issue that went viral, involving a humorous exchange of email messages between himself and the council. This got picked up by the production company Rumpus Media and led to the creation of his own show about consumer affairs. Asked about the show, Lycett said he wanted to create a "sexy Watchdog".

Notable cases

Boss Brewing vs. Hugo Boss 
In the second series, the show tackled a trademark issue between the Welsh brewer Boss Brewing and the German fashion house Hugo Boss over the trademark "Boss". Hugo Boss said that the brewery couldn't use the name Boss on the brewery's beer including the brewery's stout Boss Black, as the name was already a trademark for Hugo Boss.  Lycett as a joke, changed his personal name by deed poll to Hugo Boss, and created a fashion runway for a wrist brace, which the fashion house doesn't have the trademark rights to, outside on a public street at the atelier's flagship store in Regent Street, London. After the show was aired, the fashion house withdrew the complaint and agreed that the brewery could use Boss on its beers.

Due to the name change, Lycett was known as Hugo Boss both personally and professionally for seven weeks between March and April 2020, and the programme was temporarily renamed to Hugo Boss's Got Your Back during the second series.

Ross McEwan 
Got Your Back took on a case in which a nurse who had been scammed out of £11,800 by a fraudster, who posed as an employee from her bank NatWest, and did not receive a full refund from the bank. Initially, NatWest only refunded £3,800 to the customer, but claimed the rest could not be retrieved as the nurse should have been aware of scammers. In response, the programme tried to impersonate the head of the banking group at the time, Ross McEwan, on social media. After building a convincing profile, they then later put out a prank tweet saying "I've got a smelly bum bum". Later, Lycett made a scene in the reception by pretending to be bank's chief executive in the bank's headquarters in London.

After a review of what had happened to the customer, in response to the programme's investigations, the bank apologised to their customer for failing to acknowledged she had been victim of a highly suspicious fraud that had fooled her completely, and agreed to fully refund the remaining balance she was owed.

Uber Eats 
The food delivery company Uber Eats came under scrutiny by the programme, after receiving reports that food being delivered by them were coming from restaurants and takeaway establishments that had a hygiene rating of zero from the Food Standards Agency. The rating established that hygiene conditions of food retailers were extremely poor - some restaurants were found to have mice living in the kitchen and chicken being stored inappropriately, thus placing customers at serious risk of exposure to food poisoning including salmonella. An investigation discovered several restaurant and takeaway shops on Uber Eats website that had a zero food hygiene rating.

To determine how the company was at failing to provide adequate food safety protection for their customers, Got Your Back set up their own takeaway called "Le Sauter" which was based in an old skip on a car park with no legal permits. Despite being rated with a zero hygiene rating, the programme's investigation discovered that Uber Eats made no checks on their establishment whatsoever, nor did their delivery drivers notice that the food being offered was unfit for consumption. In response to the programme's findings, Uber Eats promised to make significant changes, including a requirement that all restaurants and takeaway establishments would require a rating from the Food Hygiene Rating Scheme of two or higher to make use of the company's webservice.

Hermes 
In the third series, the programme conducted an investigation against the parcel delivery company Hermes, in regards to mishandling several of their deliveries that their customers had complained about. One complaint came from a small dog bed company, which had used Hermes to courier a distinctive dog bed to a customer, worth £142. However, the dog bed never reached the customer, and the company later found the item on sale on eBay, with the delivery note highlighted on the website amongst several screenshots of the product. Hermes failed to explain why the item was never delivered and only paid a nominal £20 as compensation, despite having mishandled other items for the company.

The programme opted to investigate the complaints, after learning that Hermes often sent items it could not deliver or claimed to have lost to auction. Undercover investigators discovered that an auction house regularly received from Hermes around 60% of undelivered or lost items, despite a significant number bearing delivery notes with clear information on when it had been sent, who the recipient was, and the return address of the sender. Hermes responded to the allegations by compensating several customers whose items had been wrongfully sent to auction, after being presented with the programme's findings.

Awards 
In 2021, the programme won the prestigious RTS Programme Award for Best Formatted Popular Factual.

See also 
 Joe Lycett vs the Oil Giant – a documentary produced by Lycett and Rumpus Media
 That's Life! – a BBC magazine programme that included consumer affairs journalism and comedic skits
 Watchdog – a BBC consumer affairs programme

References

External links 
 
Joe Lycett's Got Your Back at All 4
 British Comedy Guide - Joe Lycett's Got Your Back

Channel 4 original programming
Channel 4 comedy
2019 British television series debuts
2010s British comedy television series
2020s British comedy television series
Consumer protection in the United Kingdom
Consumer protection television series
English-language television shows